"Not Shy" is a song recorded by South Korean girl group Itzy for their third extended play of the same name. It was released as the EP's lead single through JYP Entertainment and Republic on August 17, 2020. It is an R&B trap-dance song that incorporates hip-hop, pop, and caribbean elements. It was composed by Kobee and Charlotte Wilson, while it was written by JY Park “The Asiansoul” who also handled the arrangement alongside Kobee and earattack.

An accompanying music video was uploaded onto JYP's YouTube channel simultaneously with the single's release and has surpassed 200 million views on the platform.

On January 22, 2021 an English version of "Not Shy" was released on Itzy's English debut extended play Not Shy (English Ver.). It was accompanied by a music video featuring 3-D Zepeto avatars of the members. A Japanese version of "Not Shy" was also included on Itzy's first compilation album It'z Itzy, which was released on December 22, 2021.

Background and release
On June 22, 2020, it was reported that Itzy is preparing for a comeback at the end of July.

Composition
"Not Shy" composed by Kobee and Charlotte Wilson and it was written by JYP founder JY Park “The Asiansoul” who also handled the arrangement alongside Kobee and earattack. Musically, "Not Shy" is an up-tempo R&B trap-dance song accompanied by rapid beats and "intense" saxophone sounds. It incorporates hip-hop and pop elements mixed with Caribbean influence and a "reggae feel." In terms of musical notation, the song is written in the key of D minor, with a tempo of 101 beats per minute.

Lyrically, it was described as Itzy's first "love-themed song" compared to their previous work. Where the narrative of “Not Shy” is about giving authority to one’s own voice. In the context of the protagonist declaring her love to her crush—a "confession often marked by hesitancy". Where the singers sing lyrics that express the message of "don't be shy and express yourself confidently", "without hesitation," regardless of how the things would turn out, with lyrics such as "Why wait, what are you doing?" and "Why can't I tell you my heart?" that are meant to convey that the singers are "honest and confident in front of love", and that "there's no shame" in expressing one's emotions in front of the person they like. Lyrics such as "Not shy, Not me / I tell you what I want quickly / What if I can't have it? ‘Why can’t you say yeah" showed the group singing about giving encouragement "to those who hesitated" in expressing their emotions to their lover.

Critical reception
Time called "Not Shy" one of the songs that defined 2020, praising its usage of the saxophone tunes, urgent percussion and "the group’s sassy utterance", as well as how the group's established their "repertoire of self-empowering anthems in the short period since it debuted in 2019."

Accolades

Credits and personnel
Credits adopted from Melon.

Studio
 JYPE Studio – recording, mixing, digital editing
 Sterling Sound – mastering
 Studio Nomad – digital editing

Personnel
 Itzy – vocals
 Park Jin-young – lyrics, arrangement
 Sophia Pae – english lyrics, vocal director, vocal engineer
 Charlotte Wilson — composition
 Earattack — arrangement
 Kobee — composition, arrangement, vocal director, synths , bass, drum, computer programming
 Perry (PERRIE) — vocal director
 Eunjung Park — recording engineer
 Manny Marroquin— mixing engineer
 Robin Florent — mixing engineer
 Chris Galland — assisting
 Jeremie Inhaber — assisting
 Zach Pereyra— assisting
 Chris Gehringer — mastering

Charts

Weekly charts

Monthly charts

Year-end charts

Certifications

|-

Release history

See also
 List of K-pop songs on the Billboard charts

References 

Itzy songs
2020 singles
2020 songs
JYP Entertainment singles
Republic Records singles
Trap music songs
Dance music songs
South Korean contemporary R&B songs
Songs written by Park Jin-young